Marco Aurélio is a Spanish or Portuguese given name.  People with the name include:

Footballers
Marco Aurélio Cunha dos Santos (born 1967), Brazilian footballer
Marquinho (footballer, born August 1986)] (Marco Aurélio Iubel), Brazilian footballer
Marco Aurélio (footballer, born 1952), Brazilian footballer
Marco Aurélio Ribeiro Barbieri (born 1983), Brazilian footballer
Marco Aurélio (footballer, born 1989), Portuguese footballer
Marco Aurélio Siqueira (born 1970), Brazilian footballer
Mehmet Aurélio, (Marco Aurélio Brito dos Prazeres, born 1977), Turkish footballer
Marcão (footballer, born 1972) (Marco Aurélio de Oliveira), Brazilian footballer
Marco Sousa (Marco Aurélio Ribeiro Sousa, born 1995), Portuguese footballer 
Marquinho (footballer, born 1982), (Marco Aurelio Pereira Alves, born 1982), Brazilian footballer

Politicians
Marco Aurelio Robles (1905–1990), President of Panama
Marco Aurelio Soto (1846—1908), President of Honduras
Marco Aurélio Garcia (1941–2017), Brazilian politician

Other people
Marco Aurelio Denegri (1938–2018), Peruvian intellectual
 Marco Aurélio dos Santos (born 1974), Brazilian futsal player
Marco Aurélio Mello (born 1946), Brazilian judge
Marco Aurélio Motta (born 1960), Brazilian volleyball

See also
 
 Aurelio (disambiguation)
 Marcos Aurélio

Given names